Zalm is a surname. Notable people with the surname include:

Bill Vander Zalm (born 1934), Canadian politician and businessman
Gerrit Zalm (born 1952), Dutch politician and businessman
Joop Zalm (1897–1969), Dutch weightlifter